The Toronto Central LHIN is one of fourteen Local Health Integration Networks (LHINs) in the Canadian province of Ontario.

The Toronto Central Local Health Integration Network is a community-based, non-profit organization funded by the Government of Ontario through the Ministry of Health and Long-Term Care.

Services
Toronto Central LHIN plans, funds and coordinates the following operational public health care services to a population of approximately 1.15 million people:

 Hospitals
 West Park Healthcare Centre
 Providence Healthcare
 Baycrest Hospital
 Hospital for Sick Children
 Mount Sinai Hospital
 Bridgepoint Hospital
 Runnymede Healthcare Centre
 Toronto Grace Health Centre
 St. Michael's Hospital
 Michael Garron Hospital
 Women's College Hospital
 St. Joseph's Health Centre
 Toronto General Hospital
 Toronto Western Hospital
 Princess Margaret Cancer Centre
 Sunnybrook Health Sciences Centre
 Toronto Rehabilitation Institute
 Centre for Addiction and Mental Health
 Long-Term Care Homes
 Home and Community Care (Formally Community Care Access Centres (CCAC))
 Community Support Service Agencies
 Mental Health and Addiction Agencies
 Community Health Centres (CHCs)

Geographic area
Toronto Central LHIN services a region focused on the centre of the City of Toronto.  Neighbourhoods served include:

 Area 1 West: Etobicoke / High Park
 Area 2 North West: Davenport / Bloor
 Area 3 South West: West downtown / Parkdale
 Area 4 North Central:  Midtown / Leaside / North Riverdale / Forest Hill
 Area 5 South East: East downtown / South Riverdale
 Area 6 East: Old East York / East End / The Beach
 Area 7 North East: Flemingdon / Thorncliffe / Crescent Town / Oakridge

Budget
The Toronto Central LHIN has an annual budget of approximately $4.2 billion.

External links
 Toronto Central LHIN

References

Health regions of Ontario
Health in Toronto